Walsham may refer to:

People:
Geoff Walsham (born 1946), English scholar in the Social Study of Information Systems
Walsham baronets, of Knill Court in the County of Hereford, a title in the Baronetage of the United Kingdom
Sir John Walsham, 2nd Baronet (1830–1905), British diplomat
Walsham How (1823–1897), English bishop

Places:
North Walsham, market town and civil parish in Norfolk, England
South Walsham, village and civil parish in Norfolk, England
Walsham Rocks, group of rocks east of Buff Island at the southwest end of the Palmer Archipelago, Antarctica
Walsham le Willows, village in Suffolk, England

See also
Walsheim
Walsingham
Willisham
Wolsingham